The Cinema Audio Society Award for Outstanding Achievement in Sound Mixing for Television Series – Half Hour is an annual award given by the Cinema Audio Society to live action motion picture sound mixer for their outstanding achievements in sound mixing. The award came to its current title in 2013, when one hour and half hour series were separated into two categories. Before this, the category was labeled Outstanding Achievement in Sound Mixing for Television Series, and was given annually starting in 1994, for series' episodes aired the previous year.

Winners and nominees

1990s
Outstanding Achievement in Sound Mixing for Television

Outstanding Achievement in Sound Mixing for Television - Series

2000s

2010s

Outstanding Achievement in Sound Mixing for Television Series – Half Hour

2020s

Programs with multiple awards

5 awards
 Modern Family (ABC)

3 awards
 Deadwood (HBO)

2 awards
 24 (Fox)
 Boardwalk Empire (HBO)
 NYPD Blue (ABC)
 The West Wing (NBC)
|}

Programs with multiple nominations

9 nominations
 24 (Fox)
 Modern Family (ABC)

8 nominations
 NYPD Blue (ABC)

6 nominations
 CSI: Crime Scene Investigation (CBS)
 The Sopranos (HBO)

5 nominations
 ER (NBC)
 The X-Files (Fox)

4 nominations
 Nurse Jackie (Showtime)
 Silicon Valley (HBO)
 Veep (HBO)
 The West Wing (NBC)

3 nominations
 Alias (ABC)
 Chicago Hope (CBS)
 Deadwood (HBO)
 Dexter (Showtime)
 Lost (ABC)
 Parks and Recreation (NBC)
 Six Feet Under (HBO)
 Star Trek: Voyager (UPN)

2 nominations
 Ballers (HBO)
 Black-ish (ABC)
 Boardwalk Empire (HBO)
 Californication (Showtime)
 Glee (Fox)
 Law & Order (NBC)
 Mad Men (AMC)
 The Mandalorian (Disney+)
 Lois & Clark: The New Adventures of Superman (ABC)
 The Office (NBC)
 Star Trek: The Next Generation (Syndicated)
 Ted Lasso (Apple TV+)

See also
 Primetime Emmy Award for Outstanding Sound Mixing for a Comedy or Drama Series (Half-Hour) and Animation

References

External links
 Cinema Audio Society Official website

Cinema Audio Society Awards
Awards established in 1993